Maxim Mikhailovich Mikhailovsky (born July 24, 1969) is a Russian former professional ice hockey goaltender.

Mikhailovsky competed at the 1997 Men's World Ice Hockey Championships as a member of the Russia men's national ice hockey team. He played for HC CSKA Moscow. He was inducted into the Russian and Soviet Hockey Hall of Fame in 1993.

Mikhailovsky appeared on the cover of RHI Roller Hockey '95 video game.

Awards and honours

References

Max Mikhailovsky career statistics at StatsCrew.com

External links
 Russian and Soviet Hockey Hall of Fame bio

1969 births
Living people
Adirondack Red Wings players
Detroit Falcons (CoHL) players
Detroit Vipers players
HC CSKA Moscow players
HC Lada Togliatti players
Russian ice hockey goaltenders
Severstal Cherepovets players
Soviet ice hockey goaltenders
Ice hockey people from Moscow
Torpedo Nizhny Novgorod players
Los Angeles Blades players